Something You Said Last Night is a Canadian-Swiss drama film, directed by Luis De Filippis and released in 2022. The films stars Carmen Madonia as Ren, a young transgender woman in her mid 20s who accompanies her family on a vacation, during which she is torn between her desire to establish her independence and the comfort of retreating back into being taken care of by other people.

The film's cast also includes Ramona Milano, Paige Evans, Joe Parro,  Woon-A-Tai, Augustus Oicle, Drew Catherine, Mark Winnick, Mark Soltermann and Nate Colitto.

The film had its world premiere in the Discovery section at the 2022 Toronto International Film Festival on September 10, 2022. It was also selected for the 70th San Sebastián International Film Festival's 'New Directors' competitive slate.

Critical response
Barbara Goslawski of That Shelf positively reviewed the film, praising De Filippis for writing a film about a transgender character whose story centred on normal human relationships instead of trauma over her gender identity, and writing that Madonia's performance as Ren is "a marvel".

The film was rated a -A on Indiewire and was highlighted as a Critic’s Choice by Jude Dry.

The film was named to TIFF's annual year-end Canada's Top Ten list for 2022.

Awards
At TIFF, the film was the winner of the Changemaker Award.

The film also received the Sebastiane award at the San Sebastián Film Festival 

The film was shortlisted for the Directors Guild of Canada's 2022 Jean-Marc Vallée DGC Discovery Award.

References

External links 
 

2022 films
2022 drama films
2022 LGBT-related films
Canadian coming-of-age drama films
Canadian LGBT-related films
Swiss drama films
Swiss coming-of-age films
Swiss LGBT-related films
English-language Canadian films
Italian-language Canadian films
LGBT-related drama films
LGBT-related coming-of-age films
Films about trans women
2022 directorial debut films
2020s Canadian films